

V07A All other non-therapeutic products

V07AA Plasters

V07AB Solvents and diluting agents, including irrigating solutions

V07AC Blood transfusion, auxiliary products

V07AD Blood tests, auxiliary products

V07AN Incontinence equipment

QV07AQ Other non-therapeutic veterinary products

V07AR Sensitivity tests, discs and tablets

V07AS Stoma equipment

V07AT Cosmetics

V07AV Technical disinfectants

V07AX Washing agents etc.

V07AY Other non-therapeutic auxiliary products

V07AZ Chemicals and reagents for analysis

References

V07